Anna Livia is a bronze monument located in Croppies' Acre Memorial Park in Dublin, Ireland. It was formerly located on O'Connell Street.

Background 
Designed by the sculptor Éamonn O'Doherty, the monument was commissioned by businessman Michael Smurfit, in memory of his father, for the Dublin Millennium celebrations in 1988.

The monument is a personification of the River Liffey (Abhainn na Life in Irish) which runs through the city. Anna Livia Plurabelle is the name of a character in James Joyce's Finnegans Wake who also embodies the river. In the monument's original location, the river was represented as a young woman sitting on a slope with water flowing past her. Dubliners nicknamed it the "Floozie in the Jacuzzi", a nickname that was encouraged by the sculptor.

The monument was removed from its site on O'Connell Street in 2001 to make room for the Spire of Dublin. In late February 2011, partly reworked and refurbished, the statue was relocated to Croppies Memorial Park next to the Liffey, near Heuston station.

Gallery

References

Monuments and memorials in the Republic of Ireland
Buildings and structures in Dublin (city)
Outdoor sculptures in Ireland
1988 sculptures
Personifications of rivers